Storybook Land Canal Boats is an attraction located at the Disneyland and Disneyland Park (Paris) theme parks. Passengers embark on a leisurely paced outdoor boat ride through a winding canal featuring settings from Disney animated films recreated in miniature. The Disneyland version was one of the original attractions when the park opened on July 17, 1955, although the miniature buildings and landscaping were not added until the following year. The version in Disneyland Paris is named Le Pays des Contes de Fées (meaning "The Land of Fairy Tales" in French) and opened in the spring of 1994.

History

The ride's concept dates back to Walt Disney's plans for a "magical little park" across the street from his Walt Disney Studios in Burbank, California. This modestly scaled, never-built amusement park was to include a gravity flow canal boat ride among its attractions.

When plans for the much grander Disneyland were being made, there was to be a "Lilliputianland", inspired by Madurodam, a miniature city in the Netherlands that Disney once visited. However, the technology did not yet exist to create the miniature animated figures that were to inhabit the "Lilliputian" village, so the canal ride opened under the name Canal Boats of the World. It was intended to be a journey past miniature recreations of the great landmarks of the world, but time and money prevented its completion. The ride was plagued by other problems. The outboard motors were prone to overheating, often forcing the boats to be pulled by hand, and because the attraction opened with little landscaping, it earned the nickname among park executives as "The Mud Bank Ride".

After two months of operation, the Canal Boats closed while Storybook Land was constructed and the muddy banks were landscaped with miniature plants, including a bonsai tree planted by Walt Disney himself. The idea of having Monstro the whale consume the canal boats came from a never-implemented concept for a "Monstro the Whale" ride, in which small boats were to be swallowed by Monstro and then plunged down a watery path into a pond below.

The attraction reopened on June 16, 1956, under the new name Storybook Land Canal Boats. The models, scaled 1 inch to 1 foot, included Gepetto's village from Pinocchio, the Pigs' houses from Three Little Pigs, the London park from Peter Pan, Alice's cottage from Alice in Wonderland, the Old Mill from the 1937 Silly Symphony cartoon, Toad Manor from The Adventures of Ichabod and Mr. Toad, Snow White and the Seven Dwarfs' diamond mine, and Cinderella's Castle.

Over the years several scenes have been added to and removed from the attraction. Most notably, the Sultan's Palace from Aladdin appeared where the miniature Toad Hall from The Adventures of Ichabod and Mr. Toad had previously stood for a major refurbishment done in 1994. Toad Hall returned the following year in another location.

For the 50th anniversary of Disneyland in 2005, the Tinker Bell boat was painted gold and the lighthouse given a gold and maroon theme. Due to high demand, a second boat, Wendy, was painted gold and also renamed the Tinker Bell for the duration of the anniversary. Once the anniversary had concluded, both boats were repainted to their former appearance. 

Beginning December 20, 2014, the attraction at Disneyland added the village of Arendelle from Disney's Frozen including Anna and Elsa's castle, Wandering Oaken's Trading Post, and Elsa's ice palace. These additions replaced the three Dutch miniature windmills representing The Old Mill (1937).

Disneyland version

Passengers enter the attraction through a chain queue that winds in front of the loading dock. A lighthouse at the queue's entrance was once a ticket booth from when Disneyland required tickets for riding individual attractions. Storybook Land Canal Boats originally required a "D" coupon.

The motor-driven boats are scaled-down replicas of Dutch, English, and French boats. All of the boats are named after female Disney characters except for Flower (retired), the male skunk from Bambi. Passengers are seated along the edges of the boat, facing inward, although children are sometimes permitted to ride on the front flat part of the boat. A costumed guide sits just above the passengers on the back of the boat, perched above the engine housing, and narrates the ride.

After departing from the dock, the boat passes through a short cave sculpted to look like Monstro, the whale that swallowed Pinocchio. Monstro is partially animated: his eye opens and closes, and periodically steam comes out of his blow hole.

The canals past the Monstro cave are landscaped with miniature trees and shrubs. Along the banks are small buildings representing the homes of characters from Disney animated films, although not all the locations were actually depicted in film. While no characters physically appear in the attraction, many of these settings feature sound recordings of characters singing.

The miniature settings include:
 The pigs' homes from The Three Little Pigs
 An English village, with a church and the entrance to the White Rabbit's hole, from Alice in Wonderland
 London Park from Peter Pan
 The Sultan's palace from Aladdin
 The Cave of Wonders from Aladdin
 The dwarfs' cottage and mine from Snow White and the Seven Dwarfs
 The French countryside village from Cinderella, featuring a gold-spired castle
 The patchwork quilt from Lullaby Land
 Toad Hall from The Adventures of Ichabod and Mr. Toad
 Village of Arendelle from Frozen, featuring Anna and Elsa's castle, Wandering Oaken's Trading Post, and Elsa's ice palace
 Cobblestone Alpine village with Geppetto's wood shop from Pinocchio
 Prince Eric's seaside castle from The Little Mermaid
 King Triton's underwater castle, partially hidden behind a waterfall, from The Little Mermaid

The boat then returns the passengers to the loading dock from which they boarded.

The attraction closes during any fireworks shows and resumes normal operation once the show has ended.

Names of the Canal Boats:

Alice
Ariel
Aurora
Belle
Cinderella
Daisy
Fauna
Faline
Flora
Merryweather
Snow White
Tinkerbell
Wendy

Storybook Land Canal Boats Queue Music

The Second Star to the Right from Peter Pan
Snow White Overture
Babes in Toyland Overture
Sleeping Beauty Overture
Darby O'Gill and the Little People Overture
 Love is a Song / Little April Showers Medley from Bambi 
 A Dream Is A Wish Your Heart Makes / The Working Song Medley from Cinderella 

During the holiday season Storybook Land receives the same Christmas music loop as Main Street U.S.A.

Paris version

Unlike the original in California, a guide does not accompany the riders. The boats here are guided by an underwater wire rather than being propelled by an on-board motor. Passengers enter their boats via a slowly revolving platform. The whole transport system was developed by Intamin (as a Tow boat ride).
The Cave of Wonders from Aladdin midway through the voyage replaces the Disneyland version's Monstro cave. The boats also float past these settings, accompanied by music from the respective film and minimal dialogue:
 The dwarfs' mine and house from Snow White and the Seven Dwarfs
 The gingerbread house from Hansel and Gretel (Silly Symphony Version)
 Rapunzel's high tower with a braid coming out of it, from Tangled
 Prince Eric's seaside castle from The Little Mermaid
 The Greek temple and Mount Olympus from "The Pastoral Symphony" from Fantasia
 Snow-covered landscapes from Peter and the Wolf
 The "Night on Bald Mountain" scene from Fantasia
 The Cave of Wonders from Aladdin
 A scene from The Sword in the Stone
 Belle's village and the Beast's castle from Beauty and the Beast
 The Emerald City and Princess Mombi's Castle from Return to Oz (unofficial sequel to The Wizard of Oz)

Names of the Canal Boats:

Alice
Ariel
Aurore (Aurora)
Belle
Belle Marianne (Maid Marion)
Cendrillon (Cinderella)
Clochette (Tinkerbell)
Faline
Flora
Jasmine
Mary Poppins
Pâquerette (Fauna)
Pimprenelle (Merryweather)
Pocahontas
Snow White
Wendy

Technical
The canal contains 465,000 gallons of water, which flows via underground pipes to the moat around Sleeping Beauty Castle, the Jungle Cruise and to the Rivers of America, where it is pumped back to Storybook Land.

The attraction's 13 boats are powered by electric inboard motors. When not in use, they are stored in a boathouse hidden behind the waterfall containing Triton's Castle.

The houses in Storybook Land are fitted with six-inch doors and quarter-inch hinges that open and close, so the Disneyland electricians can change the lightbulbs.

Disneyland image gallery

See also
 List of Disneyland attractions

References

External links
 Disneyland :
 Land Canal Boats at Disneyland.Disney.Go.com
 Storybook Land Canal Boats at MousePlanet.com
 Disneyland Paris :
 Le Pays des Contes de Fées at Photos Magiques

Amusement rides introduced in 1955
Amusement rides introduced in 1994
Walt Disney Parks and Resorts attractions
Disneyland
Disneyland Park (Paris)
Walt Disney Parks and Resorts gentle boat rides
Fantasyland
Tow boat rides
Water rides manufactured by Intamin
1955 establishments in California
1994 establishments in France